PEAP might be an acronym or abbreviation for:

 Protected Extensible Authentication Protocol, a security protocol in computer security
 Personal Egress Air Packs
 Proactive Employee Assistance Program